National Science Talent Contest or NSTC is an extension of the National Physics Talent Contest launched by PIEAS in 1995 on the directive of the then President of Pakistan. The purpose of the NSTC is to inspire the youth of the Nation to opt for careers in science, and mathematics and to prepare young students for participation in International Science Olympiads in Physics, Biology, Chemistry and Mathematics.

Contests

National Physics Talent Contest (NPTC) 
National Physics Talent Contest (NPTC) is one of the contests of National Science Talent Contest (NSTC). The top five winners of NPTC represent Pakistan in the International Physics Olympiad.

National Biology Talent Contest (NBTC) 
National Biology Talent Contest (NBTC) is one of the contests of National Science Talent Contest (NSTC). The top four winners of NBTC represent Pakistan in the International Biology Olympiad.

National Chemistry Talent Contest (NCTC) 
National Chemistry Talent Contest (NCTC) is one of the contests of National Science Talent Contest (NSTC). The top five winners of NCTC represent Pakistan in the International Chemistry Olympiad.

National Mathematics Talent Contest (NMTC) 
National Mathematics Talent Contest (NMTC) is one of the contests of National Science Talent Contest (NSTC). The top six winners of NMTC represent Pakistan in International Mathematical Olympiad.

Eligibility and Participation

Eligibility 

 Students of 9th, 10th, & 11th (Matric/O-Levels & Intermediate-I/A-Level-I)
 Aggregate marks of 60% or more core subjects i.e. Physics, Chemistry, Biology, and Mathematics in the last exam
 Age less than 20 years on 30th June of Olympiad year
 Students who are currently studying in Intermediate (Part-II)/ A Levels (Part-II) & university students are NOT eligible to apply.

Participation 
In order to be selected as a representative for Pakistan in the International Science Olympiad (ISO), you must first pass the Screening Test  of the National Biology Talent Contest (NBTC). The top 50 students who pass the screening test will then be invited to participate in training and selection camps held at the Home Institutes (HI) of NSTC. From these camps, the top 4-6 students will be chosen to represent Pakistan in ISO, based on their performance during the camp.

The registration process for the NSTC Screening Test can be completed on the STEM Careers Programme website. The screening test is typically conducted in the month of March annually.

Cash Prizes and Scholarships 
The National Science Talent Contest (NSTC) awards cash prizes to the 'Team Pakistan' representing the country in the respective International Science Olympiad (ISO). The team is made up of students who have excelled in the NSTC and have been selected to participate in the ISO.

Cash Prizes 

 Gold Medal: 120,000 
 Silver Medal: 80,000 
 Bronze Medal: 60,000
 ''Honorable Mention: 50,000 
 International Participation:'' 20,000

Scholarships 
Scholarships for undergraduate programs in top-ranked Universities of  Pakistan may be offered to the participants of the International Science Olympiads (ISOs).

In addition to cash prizes and certificates, the Pakistan Institute of Engineering and Applied Sciences (PIEAS) offers admissions to members of the Olympiad teams in its BS programs without the requirement of any entrance examination. This is an opportunity for students to continue their education in the field of science and technology without the burden of taking an entrance examination.

Home Institutions
There are different educational institutions allotted for each subcategory of the NSTC, where students are trained and tested and further screened for the subsequent phases of the contest:

 NPTC: Pakistan Institute of Engineering and Applied Sciences (PIEAS), Islamabad
 NBTC: National Institute for Biotechnology and Genetic Engineering (NIBGE), Faisalabad
 NCTC: H.E.J Research Institute of Chemistry, University of Karachi, Karachi
 NMTC: COMSATS University Islamabad (CUI), Lahore

Achievements

International Physics Olympiad (IPhO) 
Pakistani students have been participating regularly in International Physics Contest (IPhO) since 2001 with earlier participation as observers. These students are selected through National Physics Talent Contest (NPTC).

International Biology Olympiad (IBO) 
Pakistani students have been participating regularly in International Biology Olympiad (IBO) since 2006 while earlier participation was as observer. These students are selected through National Biology Talent Contest (NBTC).

International Chemistry Olympiad 
Pakistani students have been participating regularly in International Chemistry Olympiads (IChO) since 2006. These students are selected through National Chemistry Talent Contest (NCTC).

References

External links
 Official Website
 PIEAS Website
 Facebook Page
  Higher Education Commission (HEC)
  News article

Science competitions
Scientific organisations based in Pakistan
Science events in Pakistan
